China Executive Leadership Academy in Pudong (CELAP) is a Chinese Communist Party (CCP) cadre school located in Pudong, Shanghai. The school, considered to be among the top four party schools in China, opened in late 2005.

History 
Lord Patten and Robert Zoellick had speaking engagements at the school, while Gordon Brown and Romano Prodi had once visited the school. Professor Bill Durodié of the University of Bath, UK, has lectured there since 2010 and became a visiting professor from 2014 (a position renewed from 2018).

Campus 
CELAP has a  campus, which includes buildings designed by architects based in Paris. Tom Phillips of The Guardian said that the campus is "oak-lined." Architects Anthony Bechu and Tom Sheehan designed the building to resemble a table from the Ming dynasty period. Richard McGregor, author of The Party: The Secret World of China's Communist Rulers, said that the buildings "resemble a red painting table" and that they "consciously [echo] the place where 'the master teaches the student."

Purpose 
Tom Phillips of The Guardian said "faculty directors say Shanghai’s Leadership Academy is no ordinary Party school." The executive vice president of CELAP, Feng Jun, said that while students at CELAP are instructed "to love Socialism and to strengthen their faith in the paths of Socialism with Chinese characteristics," "[i]t is not brainwashing [we do] here, it is brainstorming – finding the answers and solutions to the problem" and that "we intend for cadres studying here to free and broaden their minds. Many things can be discussed here." Jiang Haishan, a professor at the school and the head of the school's international program, said "We have an open attitude towards all civilisations that are useful to us, and [we] learn from them."

Professor Frank Pieke, the author of The Good Communist: Elite Training and State Building in Today’s China and the head of the Modern China Studies department at Leiden University, said that the school and its other schools were established because the Chinese government had "impatience with the lack of what they call the quality of local cadres and their inability to govern their localities or institutions effectively." Pieke added that the school, "very much part of the new glossy face of the Communist Party under Hu Jintao and Wen Jiabao," is used "to show to the outside world how reliable, predictable, modern they really have become" while it teaches its cadres how they should rule the country and connects them to the outside world.

Courses 

Tom Phillips of The Guardian said that while "[t]raditional Red subjects are not totally absent from the academy," "for the most part the academy seems more social media than Socialism, with dusty copies of Das Kapital replaced with talk of microblogging and lectures peppered with English aphorisms."

As of 2012 the school offers a crisis management course with a focus on the 2011 England riots.

Students 
As of 2010 the students mostly consist of rising Communist party officials, while some students are private entrepreneurs.

The name 
The official Chinese name of the college is Zhōngguó Pǔdōng Gànbù Xuéyuàn or "China Pudong Cadre College." The official English name is the "China Executive Leadership Academy in Pudong." Richard McGregor said that the word "cadre" has Communist connotations, so the English name does not use that word, and that the English name makes the institution appear "more like an MBA factory than a pillar of the party system." McGregor argued that the CCP had "calibrated the way the school presents itself at home, to its Chinese students, and separately, to the outside world." He added that "The subtle name change underlines the central purpose of the party school system, which is as much about enforcing and benchmarking loyalty as imparting modern management skills."

References

Citations

Sources 

 McGregor, Richard. The Party: The Secret World of China's Communist Rulers. Harper Perennial: New York, 2012. . Originally published in 2010 by Allen Lane, a Penguin Books imprint.

External links 

 China Executive Leadership Academy in Pudong
  China Executive Leadership Academy in Pudong

Universities and colleges in Shanghai
2005 establishments in China
Chinese Communist Party
Schools and research institutes of the Chinese Communist Party
Pudong